Another Level were a British soul and R&B-influenced boy band that formed in 1997 and broke up in 2000, consisting of Mark Baron, Dane Bowers, Bobak Kianoush and Wayne Williams. They achieved seven top ten singles, including the 1998 number-one "Freak Me".

In 2013, the band were about to reunite for the ITV2 documentary, The Big Reunion however, Williams and Baron chose not to take part in the show. Bowers was the only member to take part in the show and joined the supergroup 5th Story along with Kenzie from Blazin' Squad and former soloists Adam Rickitt, Kavana and Gareth Gates.

On 30 November 2014, it was reported that Another Level could make a comeback, but nothing happened.

Career

Formation and early career (1994–2000)
Dane Bowers and Wayne Williams were both students of the BRIT School of Performing Arts & Technology in the London Borough of Croydon when they were discovered. Williams enrolled at the school in 1995, while Bowers was in the year below, but started in 1994.

Another Level were originally conceived by Nick Raphael and Christian Tattersfield for their new record label project Northwestside Records, a BMG sub-label in the United Kingdom that had also signed Jay-Z's Roc-A-Fella Records unit in 1998. Due to Northwestside's position as an urban marketed record label, a number of R&B and hip hop stars guested on Another Level's songs. These included Jay-Z, Ghostface Killah and TQ, amongst others.

Another Level had seven top 40 singles in two years, including 1998's UK Singles Chart number one "Freak Me" (a cover of the 1993 hit by US group Silk), and a platinum-selling, eponymous debut album.

1999's gold-selling Nexus followed, along with BRIT Awards nominations, and the opening slot on Janet Jackson's European tour. In early 2000, the group split after Kianoush and Williams left the group in 1999.

The Big Reunion (2013)
On 27 August 2013, Another Level were on the verge of signing up for the ITV2 documentary, The Big Reunion, but Williams announced that he would not take part. In an interview with MTV UK, he said: "I decided not to participate in The Big Reunion because it wouldn't feel right to me...I'm in a totally different space in my life and I don't feel any need to look back." Also, Baron, who now works for Alan Sugar's company Amsprop, had been forced to pull out due to Sugar not allowing him time off work. Bowers told the Daily Star, "Another Level were supposed to do it but then Mark said he couldn't because of work. He's married to Alan Sugar's daughter and works for him. You don't say no to Alan Sugar. I was a bit annoyed because he pulled out right at the end. Surely he would have known earlier. But his loss is my gain." Bowers was the only member to take part in the show as he joined supergroup 5th Story along with Kenzie from Blazin' Squad and former soloists Adam Rickitt, Kavana and Gareth Gates.

Discography

Albums

Singles

References

British contemporary R&B musical groups
English boy bands
Musical groups established in 1997
Musical groups disestablished in 2000

Musical groups from London